Muttzmalen is a small village between Stäfa and Männedorf, in the canton of Zürich in Switzerland.

Villages in the canton of Zürich